Let's Do It Again is the second album from hip hop group Camp Lo. Released five years after their successful debut Uptown Saturday Night, the album was a critical and commercial failure.

The title is a reference to the 1975 film Let's Do It Again.

Track listing

Album Chart Positions

References

2002 albums
Camp Lo albums
Albums produced by Ski Beatz